Paphiopedilum wenshanense is a species of Paphiopedilum in the subgenus Brachypetalum found in Wenshan Zhuang and Miao Autonomous Prefecture in Yunnan, China.   The plant is found growing in densely shrubby and grassy slopes in limestone areas at elevations between 1000 and 1200 meters.

References

External links

wenshanense
Orchids of Yunnan
Plants described in 2000